Swimming with Sharks is an American television series starring Kiernan Shipka and Diane Kruger inspired by the 1994 film of the same name. The series premiered at the SXSW Film Festival and was named one of the "10 to watch" by Variety Magazine. The series premiered in the US on April 15, 2022 on The Roku Channel and internationally on Amazon Prime.

Premise
The series follows a young female assistant at the center of a studio filled with manipulators and schemers, none of whom know she is poised to outwit them all.

Cast
Kiernan Shipka as Lou Simms
Diane Kruger as Joyce Holt
Donald Sutherland as Redmond Isaacson 
Thomas Dekker as Travis
Finn Jones as Marty Bruhl
Erika Alexander as Meredith Lockheart
Ross Butler as Alex
Gerardo Celasco as Miles Bresson
Kathleen Robertson as Olive Mace

Episodes

Production
The show, which is set and filmed in Los Angeles, was originally picked up by Quibi before it went under. The production endured a nearly 8-month COVID-19 pandemic shutdown.

Reception
On Rotten Tomatoes, season 1 of the series has a 70% rating with an average score of 6.80 out of 10 based on 10 reviews. The site's critical consensus read: "Swimming with Sharks doesn’t have enough teeth to deliver on its promise of satirical bite, but the water’s warm for viewers who enjoy frothy entertainment.". Metacritic, which uses a weighted average, assigned a score of 60 out of 100 based on 7 critics, indicating "mixed or average reviews".

References

External links
 
 
 

English-language television shows
2022 American television series debuts
Roku original programming
Live action television shows based on films
Television series by Lionsgate Television
Television shows filmed in Los Angeles
Television shows set in Los Angeles
Television series about show business